Westringia fruticosa, the coastal rosemary or coastal westringia, is a shrub that grows near the coast in eastern Australia.

Description
The flowers are white, hairy and have the upper petal divided into two lobes. They also have orange-to-purply spots on their bottom half. This shrub is very tough and grows on cliffs right next to the ocean.

Cultivation
The plant's tolerance to a variety of soils, the neatly whorled leaves and  all-year flowering make it very popular in cultivation. It (or its cultivar(s)) is a recipient of the Royal Horticultural Society's Award of Garden Merit.

Gallery

References

fruticosa
Flora of New South Wales
Lamiales of Australia
Taxa named by Carl Ludwig Willdenow
Plants described in 1797